The Paratriathlon at the 2016 Summer Paralympics – Women's PT5 event at the 2016 Paralympic Games took place at 11:35 on 11 September 2016 at Fort Copacabana.

Results

Source: 

Paratriathlon at the 2016 Summer Paralympics